The Turkish Swimming Federation (TYF) is the governing body of the five aquatic sports, namely swimming, diving, synchronized swimming, water polo and open water swimming in Turkey. It was founded in 1957. The Turkish organization is member of the European Swimming League (LEN), the International Swimming Federation (FINA) and Turkish Olympic Committee. The TYF is based in Ankara and its current chairman is Associate Erkan Yalçın.

The Turkish Swimming Federation organizes aquatic sports competitions at national, European and World level in all categories for men and women of recognized age classes.

International events hosted
 1999 European Aquatics Championships - 26 July-1 August, Istanbul 
 2009 European Short Course Swimming Championships - 10–13 December, Istanbul
 Swimming at the 2011 European Youth Summer Olympic Festival - 25–29 July, Trabzon
 2012 European Junior Open Water Swimming Championships - 13–15 July, İzmit
 2012 FINA World Swimming Championships (25 m) - 12–16 December, Istanbul

See also
 List of Turkish records in swimming

References

External links
Official website

Turkey
Diving in Turkey
Federation
Water polo in Turkey
Swimming
Sports organizations established in 1957
National members of FINA
1957 establishments in Turkey
Organizations based in Ankara